The Ola is a river in Magadan Oblast, Russian Far East.

Course 
It flows SSE for about  then it bends and flows SSW across the Ola Lowland, bending again and flowing roughly southwards. Its last stretch is among wetlands between Magadan and Lake Chistoye. Finally it flows in the Taui Bay of the Sea of Okhotsk. Ola, the administrative center of Ola District is located at the mouth of the river. 

The main tributary of the Ola is the Lankovaya that joins it in its lower course from the left.

See also
List of rivers of Russia

References

External links
Water (in Russian)
Kolyma - Modern Guidebook to Magadan Oblast

Rivers of Magadan Oblast
Drainage basins of the Sea of Okhotsk